Juliana Obiong (born 23 May 1966) is an Equatoguinean sprinter. She competed in the women's 100 metres at the 1996 Summer Olympics. She was the first woman to represent Equatorial Guinea at the Olympics.

References

External links
 

1966 births
Living people
Athletes (track and field) at the 1988 Summer Olympics
Athletes (track and field) at the 1996 Summer Olympics
Equatoguinean female sprinters
Olympic athletes of Equatorial Guinea
Place of birth missing (living people)
Olympic female sprinters